Uniformed services is an abstract term that are generally bodies of people in employment of a state who wear a distinct uniform that differentiates them from the public and private sector. Their purpose is to maintain the peace, security, safety, and health of the people they serve. Examples include military personnel, police officers, corrections and firefighters.

Armed uniformed services
Some uniformed services carry weapons and ammunition on duty. They include:
 Border control
 Coast guard
 Gendarmerie
 Military
 Paramilitary
 Police
 Prison officer

Depending on role and assignment, members of:
 Customs service
 Immigration service
 Federal and provincial investigation agencies

Unarmed uniformed services
Unarmed uniformed services carry or operate other equipment to perform their duty. Such uniformed services may include:
 Civil defense organizations
 Emergency medical services
 Firefighting agencies
 Excise and taxation service
 Lighthouse Authority
 National Oceanic and Atmospheric Administration Commissioned Officer Corps
 Passport service
 Postal service
 United States Public Health Service Commissioned Corps

See also
 Uniformed services of the United States
 Hong Kong Disciplined Services

References

Civil services